= Adolphe Allard =

Belgian politician (1857–1923)

Personal details
- Born: 5 February 1857
- Died: 24 September 1923 (aged 66)

Adolphe Alphonse Allard (5 February 1857 - 24 September 1923) was a Belgian politician. He was a member of the Chamber of Representatives.

== Lifetime ==
Allard was a teacher. He became elected councilor of Braine-l'Alleud in 1895. In 1900 he was elected member of parliament and continued to exercise this office until his death. Braine-l'Alleud has an Avenue Alphonse Allard.

== Works ==
- Désarmement, Brussel, 1890
- Le Juif Errant, Gent, 1905
- Le Catéchisme des ouvriers du bâtiment, Gent, 1909
